Rev. Gregory Gerrer, OSB (July 23, 1867August 24, 1946) was a Benedictine Priest at Sacred Heart Abbey (later, St. Gregory's Abbey), artist, art historian and museum founder.

Art career
From 1900 to 1904, Gerrer studied art in Rome. Shortly after the election of Pope Pius X, Gerrer participated in a competition of artists to paint the official portrait of the new pope. When Pius saw the finished portrait by Gerrer, he selected it to be his portrait. Pius said that he choose it because the artist painted him true to life and did not minimize his facial warts.

Gerrer also painted portraits of two World War I Choctaw code talkers: Otis Leader and Joseph Oklahombi.

The largest collection of his paintings is at the Mabee-Gerrer Museum of Art in Shawnee, Oklahoma. His work is also in the Vatican art collection, Rome, Snite Museum of Art in South Bend, Indiana, and Fred Jones Jr. Museum of Art in Norman, Oklahoma.

Gerrer was a co-founder and first president of the Association of Oklahoma Artists.

Notable portraits 
 Pope Pius X
 Joseph Oklahombi
 Otis Leader
 John Benjamin Murphy

Honors

Gerrer was inducted into the Oklahoma Hall of Fame in 1931.

The University of Notre Dame conferred an honorary Doctor of Laws degree to Gerrer.

References

1867 births
1946 deaths
American Benedictines
Painters from Oklahoma
People from Ortenaukreis
St. Gregory's University
19th-century American painters
American male painters
20th-century American painters
19th-century American male artists
20th-century American male artists